Paul Marie Imbault (19 February 1909 – 17 May 1941) was a French field hockey player who competed in the 1928 Summer Olympics and in the 1936 Summer Olympics. He is the twin brother of Charles Imbault. In 1928 he was a squad member of the French team but did not play a match in the Olympic tournament. Eight years later he was a member of the French field hockey team, which finished fourth in the 1936 Olympic tournament. He played four matches as back.

References

External links
 
part 6 the field hockey tournament
Paul Imbault's profile at Sports Reference.com

1909 births
1941 deaths
French male field hockey players
Olympic field hockey players of France
Field hockey players at the 1928 Summer Olympics
Field hockey players at the 1936 Summer Olympics
French twins
Twin sportspeople
20th-century French people